Charles Alexander Clouser (born June 28, 1963) is an American keyboardist, composer, record producer, and remixer. He worked with Trent Reznor for Nine Inch Nails from 1994 to 2000, and is a composer for film and television; among his credits are the score for the Saw franchise and American Horror Story. Clouser was nominated for two Grammy Awards for Best Metal Performance in 1997.

Life and career
Clouser plays keyboard, synthesizer, theremin, and drums. He also does music programming, engineering, and mixing. He co-worked with Trent Reznor of Nine Inch Nails (1994–2000) for several projects. Before he worked with Nine Inch Nails, he was in the alternative band Burning Retna with former L.A. Guns guitarist Mick Cripps and fellow Nothing Records employee Sean Beavan. Clouser also was a member of the band 9 Ways to Sunday, which released a self-titled album in 1990. Clouser has remixed artists such as Nine Inch Nails, Marilyn Manson, White Zombie, Rammstein and Meat Beat Manifesto.

In 2004, Clouser produced the Helmet album Size Matters.  Consisting mainly of collaborations between Clouser and Page Hamilton, it was intended to be a Hamilton solo album. The first release from the collaboration, known as Throwing Punches, appeared on a soundtrack in 2003 for the film Underworld, and was credited as a Hamilton track.  Clouser created one of FirstCom music's master series discs, only sold for commercial use, in the late 1990s.

Two songs programmed by Clouser were nominated for Grammy Awards in 1997: White Zombie's "I'm Your Boogie Man" and Rob Zombie and Alice Cooper's "Hands of Death (Burn Baby Burn)," the latter of which Clouser also co-wrote and mixed.

He worked with Trent Reznor on the soundtrack of Natural Born Killers, helping record and produce a new version of "Something I Can Never Have," the original version of which appeared on Nine Inch Nails Pretty Hate Machine album. Clouser's remix of Zombie's "Dragula" can be found on The Matrix soundtrack. Another Zombie track remixed by Clouser, "Reload", appears on The Matrix Reloaded soundtrack. He produced the unfinished Hamilton project Gandhi. In 2001, Clouser formed the supergroup Revenge of the Triads with Jason Slater and Troy Van Leeuwen, although they later disbanded in 2002 without releasing any material.

Clouser provided the live synth for Alec Empire's "Intelligence And Sacrifice" tour in 2001.  He appears in the Moog documentary about electronic-music pioneer Robert Moog and composed the song "I Am a Spaceman" for the original soundtrack of that movie.

Clouser has also worked as a film and television composer, scoring the entire Saw series of films, as well as Deepwater (2005), Dead Silence (2007), Death Sentence (2007), and Resident Evil: Extinction (2007). On television, he was the composer for the TV series Las Vegas (NBC), Fastlane (Fox), and Numbers (CBS). Additionally, he composed the theme song for those shows as well as American Horror Story (FX).

Personal life
Charlie was born in Hanover, New Hampshire. He married his long-time girlfriend, photographer and model Zoe Wiseman, in the summer of 2007. He is a graduate of Hampshire College in Amherst, Massachusetts.

Discography

With Nine Inch Nails
 The Downward Spiral (1994)
 Further Down the Spiral (1995)
 The Perfect Drug (1997)
 Closure (1997)
 The Day the World Went Away (1999)
 The Fragile (1999)
 Into the Void (1999)
 Starfuckers, Inc. (1999)
 Things Falling Apart (2000)
 And All That Could Have Been (2002)

Marilyn Manson
 Portrait of an American Family (1994)
 "Lunchbox" (1994)
 Smells Like Children (1995)
 "Sweet Dreams" (1995)
 Antichrist Superstar (1996)
 "Tourniquet Pt. 2" (1997)
 Lest We Forget: The Best Of (2004)

White Zombie
 Astro Creep: 2000 (1995)
 More Human than Human (1995)
 Real Solution #9 (1995)
 Ratfinks, Suicide Tanks and Cannibal Girls (1996)
 Supersexy Swingin' Sounds (1996)
 Electric Head Pt. 2 (The Ecstasy) (1996)

Rob Zombie
 "The Great American Nightmare" with Howard Stern (1997)
 Hellbilly Deluxe (1998)
 Dragula (1998)
 Living Dead Girl (1999)
 American Made Music to Strip By (1999)
 Remix-a-Go-Go (1999)
 The Best of Rob Zombie (2006)

Other artists
Clouser has performed on releases with a variety of other artists and bands.

 9 Ways to Sunday – 9 Ways to Sunday (1990)
 12 Rounds – Pleasant Smell (1998)
 Alec Empire – Live at Fuji-Rock (2001)
 Apartment 26 – Music for the Massive (2004)
 Black Light Burns – Cruel Melody (2007)
 Burning Retna – Frozen Lies (2006)
 Collide
 Vortex (2004)
 Live at the El Rey (2005)
 David Bowie
 I'm Afraid of Americans (1997)
 Seven (2000)
 Best of Bowie (2002)
 Deltron 3030 – Positive Contact (2001)
 Die Krupps
 The Final Remixes (1994)
 Rings of Steel (1995)
 Fire (1997)
 Esthero
 Breath from Another (1998)
 Heaven Sent (1998)
 FAT – Down Time (1995)
 Foetus – Blow (2001)

 Fuel – Natural Selection (2003)
 Helmet – Size Matters (2004)
 John Frusciante – Shadows Collide with People (2004)
 Killing Joke – Democracy (1996)
 Meat Beat Manifesto – Asbestos Lead Asbestos (1996)
 A Perfect Circle – eMOTIVe (2004)
 Prong
 Broken Peace (1994)
 Rude Awakening (1996)
 Puscifer – Don't Shoot the Messenger EP (2007)
 Radiator – Black Shine (remix) (1998)
 Rammstein – Stripped (1998)
 Reach 454 – Reach 454 (2003)
 Real McCoy – Another Night (1994)
 Schwein – Son of Schweinstein (2001)
 Snake River Conspiracy
 Sonic Jihad  – "Oh Well" (2000)
 Splattercell – AH - ReMiKSiS (2000)
 Type O Negative
 Cinnamon Girl (1997)
 D-Side 1 (2000)
 Least Worst Of (2000)

Soundtracks

Film

Television

Video games

References

External links

 Burning Retna on Myspace

1963 births
Living people
Musicians from New Hampshire
American audio engineers
American film score composers
American male film score composers
American industrial musicians
Record producers from New Hampshire
American television composers
Nine Inch Nails members
White Zombie (band)
People from Hanover, New Hampshire
Hampshire College alumni
Prong (band) members
21st-century American keyboardists